DMTX may refer to:
 Data Matrix, a two-dimensional barcode
 Domtar Paper's railroad reporting mark
 Dimension Therapeutics's stock ticker symbol